Future Microbiology is a peer-reviewed medical journal that was established in 2006 and is published by Future Medicine. The editors-in-chief are Richard A. Calderone (Georgetown University) and B. Brett Finlay (University of British Columbia). The journal covers all aspects of the microbiological sciences, including virology, bacteriology, parasitology, and mycology.

Abstracting and indexing
The journal is abstracted and indexed in BIOSIS Previews, Biotechnology Citation Index, CAB Abstracts, Chemical Abstracts, Elsevier Biobase, EMBASE/Excerpta Medica, Index Medicus/MEDLINE/PubMed, Science Citation Index Expanded, and Scopus. According to the Journal Citation Reports, the journal has a 2017 impact factor of 3.190, ranking it 48th out of 126 journals in the category "Microbiology".

References

External links
 

English-language journals
Microbiology journals
Publications established in 2006
Future Science Group academic journals
Journals published between 13 and 25 times per year